Matt Vogler (born September 25, 1969) is a former American football quarterback who played two seasons in the Arena Football League with the Massachusetts Marauders and Miami Hooters. He first enrolled at Auburn University before transferring to Texas Christian University. He attended A. P. Leto High School and Thomas Richard Robinson High School in Tampa, Florida

Early years
Vogler first played high school football for the A. P. Leto High School Falcons before transferring to play for the Thomas Richard Robinson High School Knights. He was an All County All Suncoast selection as a senior. He threw for a school record 2817 yards and broke the record for touchdowns in a season with 23. Vogler's 281.7 yard per game average was second best in the nation in 1986 and fourth best in state history at that time.

College career

Auburn University
Vogler first played college football for the Auburn Tigers.

Texas Christian University
Vogler transferred to play for the TCU Horned Frogs. He threw for an NCAA Division I record 690 yards in a game in 1990.

Professional career

Massachusetts Marauders
Vogler played for the Massachusetts Marauders in 1994.

Miami Hooters
Vogler played for the Miami Hooters in 1995.

References

External links
Just Sports Stats
Auburn stats
Texas Christian stats

Living people
1969 births
Players of American football from Tampa, Florida
American football quarterbacks
Auburn Tigers football players
TCU Horned Frogs football players
Massachusetts Marauders players
Miami Hooters players
A.P. Leto High School alumni